Fruela II (Froila II) (c. 875–July 925) was the King of Asturias from the death of his father, Alfonso III of Asturias, in 910 to his own death. When his father died, the kingdom was divided, with the third son, Fruela, taking the original portion (Asturias); the second, Ordoño, taking Galicia; and the eldest, García, taking León. As king of Asturias, he had the job of consolidating the region later called Castile and keeping its counts in check.

Fruela's mother was Jimena of Pamplona. He himself married twice, first to a woman of unknown origin named Nunila or Nunilona (late sources make her a member of the Basque Jimenez dynasty, but this is unsupported). His second wife, Urraca, according to Ibn Khaldun and Ibn Hazm, was the daughter of the Banu Qasi governor of Tudela. They were married by 917.

Fruela maintained good relations with his brother Ordoño, who had the hegemony. They cooperated in the Reconquista, and Fruela undersigned Ordoño's diplomas as Froila rex with his second wife, Urraca regina.  When Ordoño died in 924, the magnates ignored his heirs and elected Fruela king. Fruela had never been popular with the nobles and his subjects, and his election has been doubted by some, who see it as a likely usurpation. He assassinated Gebuldo and Aresindo, sons of Olmundo, who claimed descent from King Witiza and thus further alienated the nobility. For this, one chronicler relates, he was condemned to a reign of only fourteen months. According to Ramón Menéndez Pidal, he exiled the bishop Frunimio of León, a relation of Olmundo. Whatever the case, he did reign for a mere fourteen more months and died in the early summer of 925, some sources say, after having contracted leprosy. Following Fruela's death, there were several competing claimants to his lands, including his younger brother Ramiro (who appears to have married the widowed queen Urraca bint Qasi and used the royal title but was eventually unsuccessful) and the sons of his brother Ordoño II, along with his own young sons. There is some debate about the immediate succession, although eventually, his family lost out to brother Ordoño.

According to Bishop Pelayo, he left three sons by Nunila: Alfonso, Ordoño, and Ramiro. Ibn Khaldun gives Ordoño and Ramiro to Urraca and leaves open the possibility of other children by either wife.

References

Genealogy
 Ni obtuvo gloria ni venció enemigo

|-

|-

870s births
925 deaths
Year of birth uncertain
10th-century Asturian monarchs
Beni Alfons
Deaths from leprosy
9th-century Asturian monarchs
10th-century Leonese monarchs
10th-century Galician monarchs
Sons of emperors